Little Sparrow is the thirty-eighth solo studio album by American singer-songwriter Dolly Parton. It was released on January 23, 2001, by Sugar Hill and Blue Eye Records. The album received a Grammy nomination for Best Bluegrass Album and "Shine" won Best Female Country Vocal Performance. The album is dedicated to Parton's father, Lee Parton, who died in November 2000.

Content
While the album's predecessor, The Grass Is Blue, featured straightforward bluegrass, Little Sparrow features a blend of Appalachian folk, bluegrass and country gospel styles. Each of the musical styles is a notable part of the culture from Parton's East Tennessee upbringing. In addition to a number of traditional songs and Parton's own compositions, the album features a reworking of the Collective Soul hit, "Shine", and the Restless Heart hit, "A Tender Lie", as well as a bluegrass version of Cole Porter's "I Get a Kick Out of You". Among the backing musicians were members of the alternative bluegrass band Nickel Creek, Alison Krauss, and members of Irish folk music band Altan.

Parton had previously recorded two of the tracks featured on the album. "Down from Dover" had originally been recorded by Parton in 1969 and included on her 1970 album, The Fairest of Them All. "My Blue Tears" was originally recorded in 1971 and included on Parton's Coat of Many Colors album. Parton also recorded the song with Emmylou Harris and Linda Ronstadt in 1978 for an ill-fated Trio project. This recording would eventually surface on Ronstadt's 1982 album, Get Closer.

Release and promotion
The album was announced by Sugar Hill Records on December 6, 2000. In a press release, Parton said, 

On the day of the album's release Parton appeared on NBC's Today. She appeared on the Late Show with David Letterman on January 29, performing "Shine". She also made an appearance on Late Night with Conan O'Brien on February 1, where she performed "A Tender Lie" and "I Will Always Love You". On February 27, Parton was interviewed and performed "Little Sparrow" on theTonight Show with Jay Leno.

Parton also made television appearances in Europe. She appeared on Parkinson on February 17 and So Graham Norton on February 23, where she performed "Marry Me".

Critical reception

Upon its release, Little Sparrow received widespread acclaim from music critics. At Metacritic, which assigns a normalized rating out of 100 to reviews from mainstream critics, the album received an average score of 86, which indicates "universal acclaim", based on 10 reviews. The review published in the January 27, 2001 issue of Billboard said, "Recognizing that mainstream country radio is pretty much off limits, Dolly Parton has wisely followed her muse of late rather than try to gauge commercialism, and God bless her for it. Little Sparrow is among Parton's best work ever, a stellar collection that peels the paint off the walls. Parton's voice remains a thing of wonder, whether it's on the haunting Smoky Mountains soul of the title cut, the aching "My Blue Tears", or the backwoods waltz "Bluer Pastures". "Mountain Angel" is spooky, "Marry Me" is a hoot, and both pay homage to the singer's mountain roots. Parton is still writing killer songs (half the 14 cuts), and the covers are lightning in a jug, including rousing takes on Collective Soul's "Shine", the Eagles' "Seven Bridges Road", and Cole Porter's "I Get a Kick Out of You". Production is of the back-porch variety, with bluegrass instrumentation mostly carrying the load. The pickers are top shelf, the harmonies are to die for, and Dolly rules. An instant classic."

Rolling Stone gave a positive review of the album and said, "Throughout Little Sparrow, Parton’s silvery, force-of-nature voice cuts to the heart of the matter, convincingly making the case that — famous literary dictum aside — you can go home again." Writing for PopMatters, Charlotte Robinson gave a positive review, saying that the album "contains some of the most beautiful and affecting music Parton has ever made, and the fact that she is doing it in her fifth decade makes it all the more dazzling an achievement." Alanna Nash of Entertainment Weekly gave the album an A and said the album "proves a sequel can surpass the original." Barry Weber of AllMusic gave the album 4 out of 5 stars and said that the album's title track is "an ingenious metaphor that, along with a slow, aching melody, and a flawless production and performance, helps round out what is truly one of the best songs Dolly Parton has written in years."

Commercial performance
The album peaked at No. 12 on the US Billboard Top Country Albums chart, No. 97 on the US Billboard 200 chart, No. 12 on the US Billboard Bluegrass Albums chart and No. 3 on the US Billboard Independent Albums chart. In the UK the album peaked at No. 1 on the OCC Country Albums Chart and No. 30 on the OCC Albums Chart. The album peaked at No. 27 in Sweden No. 39 in Denmark. The album was certified Silver by the British Phonographic Industry in April 2001. As of December 2003 the album has sold 212,000 copies in the United States.

In April 2001, "A Tender Lie", "Bluer Pastures", and "Seven Bridges Road" were released as singles simultaneously to country, bluegrass, and Americana radio stations, respectively. None of them received enough airplay to chart. "Shine" was released as the fourth and final single in July 2001. Its music video premiered June 13 on CMT Most Wanted Live.

Accolades
At the 44th Annual Grammy Awards the album was nominated for Best Bluegrass Album and "Shine" won Best Female Vocal Performance. The "Shine" music video was nominated for Female Video of the Year at the 2002 CMT Music Awards.

Track listing

Personnel
Adapted from the album liner notes.

Greg Allen – musician photos
Monty Allen – drones
Barry Bales – bass
James Bauer – assistant engineer
David Blair – hair
Becky Isaacs Bowman – harmony vocals
David Bryant – assistant engineer
Steve Buckingham – producer, autoharp, dulcimer
Candy Burton – makeup
Dermot Byrne – accordion
Marcia Campbell – clog dancer
Neal Cappellino – additional engineering, digital editing
Jennie Carey – production assistant
Ciaran Curran – bouzouki
Chip Davis – drones
Richard Dennison – drones
Jerry Douglas – resophonic guitar
Stuart Duncan – fiddle
Koji Egawa – assistant engineer
Barry Etris – Little Sparrow illustration
Good & Evil Design - album design
Robert Hadley – mastering
Terry Herd – musician photos
Jim Herrington – photography
Peyton Hoge – musician photos
Rebecca Lyn Howard – harmony vocals
Byron House – bass
Sonya Isaacs – harmony vocals
Carl Jackson – bass vocals, harmony vocals
Thomas Johnson – assistant engineer
Mark Kelly – guitar
Alison Krauss – harmony vocals
Kimberly Levitan – art direction
Keith Little – harmony vocals
Claire Lynch – harmony vocals
Pat McInerney – percussion
Jim Mills – banjo
John Mock – harmonium, whistle
Marshall Morgan – assistant engineer
Mairéad Ní Mhaonaigh – Irish verse ("In the Sweet By and By")
Maura O'Connell – harmony vocals
Proinsias O'Maonaigh – Irish verse translation ("In the Sweet By and By")
Gary Paczosa – recording, mixing, musician photos
Dolly Parton – lead vocals, harmony vocals
Bubba Richardson – clog dancer
Doug Sax – mastering
Mike Snider – clawhammer banjo
Daithi Sproule – guitar
Bryan Sutton – guitar
Chris Thile – mandolin
Ciaran Tourish – whistle, low whistle
Dan Tyminski – harmony vocals
Darrin Vincent  – harmony vocals
Rhonda Vincent  – harmony vocals
Mary E. Yeomans – musician photos

Charts

Weekly charts

Year-end charts

Certifications

Release history

References

2001 albums
Dolly Parton albums
Sugar Hill Records albums
Albums produced by Steve Buckingham (record producer)